Ysgol Ardudwy is a bilingual secondary school for 11–16 year olds at Harlech, Gwynedd, Wales. It serves the seaside communities of Penrhyndeudraeth, Harlech, Abermaw (Barmouth) and nearby villages. It had 316 pupils on the roll in 2022.

Welsh language
Ysgol Ardudwy is categorised linguistically by the Welsh Government as a category 2A school: at least 80 per cent of subjects apart from English and Welsh are taught only through the medium of Welsh to all pupils. However, one or two subjects are taught to some pupils in English or in both languages.

In December 2018, 34 per cent of pupils came from Welsh-speaking homes, but 89 per cent of the school's pupils were found to speak Welsh fluently.

Alumni
Mari Strachan (born 1945), novelist and librarian
Philip Pullman (born 1946), children's novelist
David Silvester (born 1958), mathematician and author
Rhodri Jeffreys-Jones (born 1952), emeritus professor of history

References

External links
 

Secondary schools in Gwynedd
ardudwy